Olimpiada Vladimirovna Ivanova (born 26 August 1970) is a Russian race walker.

Her first gold medal was won in the 2001 Edmonton World Championships, where she beat the rest of the world with the time 1.27:48. A year later, in 2002, she won another gold medal at the 2002 European Championship in Munich.

The next major sporting event she took part in was the 2004 Athens Olympics where she finished second. The winner was the home hero Athanasia Tsoumeleka, who deeply moved the ecstatic Greek crowd by getting her country's first ever medal in the event (time 1:29:12). Ivanova finished four seconds later and could not hide her disappointment. She did, however, win the gold for the 20 km walk in the 2005 Helsinki World Championships, beating the world record. For this record she was added to the 2007 Guinness World Record.

Ivanova was stripped of her silver medal in the 10 kilometer walk at the 1997 World Championships in Athletics after she had tested positive for stanozolol, and she was banned for two years. She is part of a group of over a dozen elite Russian race walkers, all coached by Viktor Chegin to receive doping bans.

Olimpiada Ivanova is married and has a daughter.

International competitions

See also
List of doping cases in athletics
List of Olympic medalists in athletics (women)
List of World Athletics Championships medalists (women)
List of 2004 Summer Olympics medal winners
List of European Athletics Championships medalists (women)
List of doping cases in sport by substance
List of Chuvashes
Russia at the World Athletics Championships
Doping at the World Athletics Championships

References

1970 births
Living people
People from Chuvashia
Sportspeople from Chuvashia
Russian female racewalkers
Olympic athletes of Russia
Olympic silver medalists for Russia
Olympic silver medalists in athletics (track and field)
Athletes (track and field) at the 2004 Summer Olympics
Medalists at the 2004 Summer Olympics
Goodwill Games medalists in athletics
Competitors at the 2001 Goodwill Games
Competitors at the 1994 Goodwill Games
World Athletics Championships athletes for Russia
World Athletics Championships winners
World Athletics Championships medalists
Athletes stripped of World Athletics Championships medals
European Athletics Championships winners
European Athletics Championships medalists
Russian Athletics Championships winners
World Athletics record holders
Doping cases in athletics
Russian sportspeople in doping cases
Chuvash people
Goodwill Games gold medalists in athletics